Overlade is a village/town in western Himmerland, Denmark, with a population of 447 (1 January 2022), located 12 km north from Farsø, 16 km south of Løgstør, 3 kilometers from Limfjord and seven kilometers south of Ranum.
The village is in the North Denmark Region and belongs to the Vesthimmerland Municipality. The city was founded by the monks of Vitskøl Abbey most likely the monks were from the Cistercian Order. The city has in recent history been a rich business with several factories, forges, bakeries, butcher sale, bicycle shop and much more. The city inn burned down in 1984. Like many small towns, some of these businesses through time has gone, but the town still has some shops and craft stores.

Notable people 
 Per Bach Laursen (born 1962 in Overlade) current Mayor of Vesthimmerlands Municipality

References

Villages in Denmark
Cities and towns in the North Jutland Region
Towns and settlements in Vesthimmerland Municipality